Chuvashcinema or Chuvashkino (now SC "Chuvashkino") is a Chuvash and Russian cinema company which was engaged in manufacture, purchase, storage and hire art and documentary films.

History
Cinema company was based on June, 22nd, 1926 in Cheboksary (Chuvash ASSR) by the director, a script writer, the actor, the Honored worker of arts of the Russian Federation, the National actor of the Chuvash Republic Ioakim Maksimov-Koshkinsky.

During the existence the studio has released 6 artistic and tens of documentary films. The first feature film was the Volga rebels, released in 1926. Then the studio mostly focused on the production of documentary films.

Current status
Now Chuvash cinema is engaged in definition of the state policy in the field of cinematography in Chuvash Republic. Its archives include a number of art-publicistic tapes created together with the Kazan studio.

External links
 "Dmitry Youman against Vladimir Korolevich", author D. Petrov, newspaper Republic, №40 (453), 8.10.2003.
 ВИЗУАЛИЗАЦИЯ СРЕДСТВАМИ КИНО ЭТНИЧЕСКОЙ КУЛЬТУРЫ ЧУВАШЕЙ
 Сергей Щербаков: Старое чувашское кино — в массы

Companies based in Chuvashia